NGC 2801, also known as PGC 26183, is a spiral galaxy in the constellation Cancer. It was discovered February 17, 1865, by Albert Marth.

References 

2801
Spiral galaxies
Cancer (constellation)
026183